Stigmella viscerella is a moth of the family Nepticulidae. It is found in central and southern Europe, including Great Britain, but not on the Iberian Peninsula.

The wingspan is 5–6 mm. Adults are on wing from May to June in one generation.

The larvae feed on Ulmus minor. They mine the leaves of their host plant. The mine, which is very compact, consists of a strongly contorted corridor in the form of loops. Only the last part of the corridor is free.

External links
Fauna Europaea
bladmineerders.nl

Nepticulidae
Moths of Europe
Moths described in 1853